Electra is a city in Wichita County, Texas, United States. It is part of the Wichita Falls metropolitan statistical area. The population was 2,791 at the 2010 census., down from 3,168 in 2000. Electra claims the title of Pump Jack Capital of Texas, a title made official by the state in 2001, and has celebrated an annual Pump Jack Festival since 2002. It was named in honor of Electra Waggoner, an heiress to the Waggoner Ranch.

History 
Daniel Waggoner started a ranch in present-day Electra in 1852. Around 30 years later, the Fort Worth and Denver Railway was built, and its railroad tracks ran through the area. In 1885, Waggoner's son, William Thomas Waggoner, successfully lobbied railroad executives to build a railroad station at the site. By this time, the Waggoner ranch covered a half-million acres. Until this time, the town was called Waggoner, but following the building of the station and a post office in 1889, it was dubbed Beaver Switch, after the nearby Beaver Creek. The town was renamed again in 1907, this time after Waggoner's daughter, Electra Waggoner.

Water can be scarce in this region of Texas, so Waggoner started drilling for water for the town's new residents. Most of these drilling sites were befouled by crude oil, which made the water unfit for drinking. Three years later, a developer from Fort Worth named Solomon Williams bought the land from Waggoner. Soon thereafter, he annexed nearby land, subdivided the land, and placed advertisements in national media trying to increase the population. His efforts were successful, and the town grew from a population of 500 to 1,000 between 1907 and 1910. The Waggoner family still owns much of the same land they did in the beginning and still drills for oil there.

In 1911, the Electra Independent School District was created.

Word spread quickly, and the population increased to over a 1000, with many more oil workers commuting from Wichita Falls. The town soon had brick buildings, cement sidewalks, and a telephone exchange.

In 1936, Electra had well over 6,000 residents, but by the 1960s, the population had decreased to just over 5,000. The Dallas-Fort Worth Metroplex was growing, and many people moved away. By 2000, Electra's population had fallen to about 3,000.

Geography 

Electra is located at  (34.030809, –98.917281). According to the United States Census Bureau, the city has a total area of 2.4 mi2 (6.3 km2), all of it land.

Demographics

2020 census 

As of the 2020 United States census, there were 2,292 people, 1,253 households, and 606 families residing in the city.

2000 census 
As of the census of 2000,  3,168 people, 1,279 households, and 860 families resided in the city. The population density was 1,299.0 people per square mile (501.3/km). The 1,529 housing units averaged 626.9 per mi2 (241.9/km2). The racial makeup of the city was 87.66% White, 4.58% African American, 1.10% Native American, 0.06% Asian, 4.29% from other races, and 2.30% from two or more races. Hispanics or Latinos of any race were 8.68% of the population.

Of the 1,279 households, 32.8% had children under the age of 18 living with them, 51.4% were married couples living together, 12.2% had a female householder with no husband present, and 32.7% were not families; 30.1% of all households were made up of individuals, and 16.4% had someone living alone who was 65 years of age or older. The average household size was 2.46 and the average family size was 3.03.

In the city, the population was distributed as 27.7% under the age of 18, 7.9% from 18 to 24, 25.7% from 25 to 44, 20.8% from 45 to 64, and 17.8% who were 65 years of age or older. The median age was 38 years. For every 100 females, there were 90.0 males. For every 100 females age 18 and over, there were 82.1 males.

The median income for a household in the city was $24,022, and for a family was $30,116. Males had a median income of $25,610 versus $17,292 for females. The per capita income for the city was $13,213. About 17.8% of families and 20.6% of the population were below the poverty line, including 24.3% of those under age 18 and 15.4% of those age 65 or over.

Education 

The three public schools are: B.M. Dinsmore Elementary School, with 225 students enrolled in prekindergarten through fourth grade; Electra Junior High with 172 students in grades five through eight; and Electra High School with 149 students enrolled in ninth through 12th grades. Electra High School's athletic teams are called the Tigers. The student/teacher ratio at each of the schools is 14:1, 13:1, and 9:1, respectively.

Notable people 

 Ace Reid, An artist and humorist, he grew up and lived in Electra until 1943, when he joined the Navy

Climate 
The climate in this area is characterized by hot, humid summers and generally mild to cool winters.  According to the Köppen climate classification system, Electra has a humid subtropical climate, Cfa on climate maps.

Utilities 
Telephone and Internet is provided by Hilliary Communications.

References

Further reading 
 2006–2007 Academic Excellence Indicator System
 Adams, Jerry. Trade Token Tales: Electra Texas
 Electra, Texas. The Handbook of Texas Online
 Pruitt, Bernadette. A Fading Town's Liquid Legacy: Once-thriving Electra Hopes 'Pump Jack' Title Brings New Fortune. Dallas Morning News. 2001-09-23.
 Yates, John. Masonry in the Oil Patch: The First 75 Years of Electra Lodge No.1067 AF & AM. Electra Lodge No. 1067. 1988-06-25.

External links 

 Electra Official Website
 Events in Electra, The Pump Jack Capital Association
 Electra ISD, Electra Independent School District
 Electra Hospital District
 Cowpokes Film Festival Official Website for Electra

Cities in Texas
Cities in Wichita County, Texas
Wichita Falls metropolitan area